Swamp Angel may refer to:

Swamp Angel, Kansas
Swamp Angels, a New York City, waterfront, street gang, during the mid-nineteenth century
a Parrott rifle used in the bombardment of Charleston, South Carolina
Swamp Angel (children's book), by Anne Isaacs (1994)